Jackson's climbing salamander (Bolitoglossa jacksoni) is a species of salamander in the family Plethodontidae.
It is endemic to Guatemala.
Its natural habitat is subtropical or tropical moist montane forests.
It is threatened by habitat loss. The salamander is among the 25 "most wanted lost" species that are the focus of Global Wildlife Conservation's "Search for Lost Species" initiative, as it had not been seen since 1975. It was rediscovered in 2017 at an amphibian reserve in the Sierra de los Cuchumatanes.

References

External links
 

Bolitoglossa
Endemic fauna of Guatemala
Amphibians of Guatemala
Taxonomy articles created by Polbot
Amphibians described in 1984